Maurice Green (19 March 1900 – 11 September 1952) was a Guyanese cricketer. He played in sixteen first-class matches for British Guiana from 1923 to 1938.

See also
 List of Guyanese representative cricketers

References

External links
 

1900 births
1952 deaths
Guyanese cricketers
Guyana cricketers